Orchestra Macaroon is a British music group that combines traditional grooves, Celtic-style melodies, and jazzy improvisations, using various combinations of piano, double-bass, percussion, yang qin, brass, cymbal and Bagpipes;  Its style finds its roots in traditions from a range of different countries, including China, Scotland, Brazil, Galicia, Ireland, and Jamaica.  

The group’s songwriter, Colin Blakey, was a member of The Waterboys from 1987 to 1990.

Orchestra Macaroon emerged from ongoing collective musical, explorations of groove, melody, and improvisation during sessions that were held on Easdale Island, Argyll, Scotland, in 2003. These experiments resulted in the recording of an album in 2004 called Breakfast In Balquhidder. 

In 2021, the group released a second album titled Hong Kong to Sligo.

Members 
Breakfast in Balquhidder featured the following musicians:
Colin Blakey - piano, gaita, percussion
Steve 'Wee' Brown - double bass
Phil Bull - drums, percussion
Stephen McNally - gaita, whistles, percussion
Lorne Cowieson - flugelhorn, trumpet, percussion
Kieran Gallagher - congas, bongos, berimbau, clay pots
Paddy Martin - highland pipes, uilleann pipes, whistles
Kim-ho Ip - yang qin
Ron Blakey - clarinet
Steve Wickham - violins

References
Footnotes

General references
The album was reviewed in:
The Guardian 29/10/04
Scotland On Sunday 24/10/04
FT Magazine 27/11/04
Edinburgh Guide Jan 05
Scots Magazine Feb 05
The Living Tradition Jan/Feb 05

External links
Transcriptions of the melodies 

British experimental musical groups
Bagpipe players